Albertus Anthonie (Albert) de Vries (born 10 July 1955) is a Dutch politician. As a member of the Labour Party (Partij van de Arbeid) he was a member of the House of Representatives between 20 September 2012 and 23 March 2017. Previously he was an alderman of the municipality of Middelburg from March 2002 to 1 October 2012.

References

External links 
 
  Albert de Vries at the website of the Labour Party
  Albert de Vries at the website of the House of Representatives

1955 births
Living people
Labour Party (Netherlands) politicians
Members of the House of Representatives (Netherlands)
Aldermen in Zeeland
People from Middelburg, Zeeland
21st-century Dutch politicians